Themison of Samos was a naval commander in the service of Antigonus Monophthalmus.

He is first mentioned by Diodorus Siculus (Library of History, XIX.62) as bringing a fleet of 40 ships to Antigonus, who was besieging Tyre, from the Hellespont. He is next mentioned as participating in Demetrius Poliorcetes' expedition to Cyprus in 306 BC, and led the light vessels in the centre of the Antigonid fleet in the great sea-fight off Salamis against Ptolemy of Egypt (Diodorus, XX.50), which ended in a major victory for the Antigonid forces.

References

Sources
 

4th-century BC births
4th-century BC Greek people
Ancient Greek admirals
Ancient Samians
Generals of Antigonus I Monophthalmus